Joseph Leonard Maries White DFC, (6 January 1897 – 24 February 1925) was a Canadian First World War flying ace, officially credited with 22 victories.

Text of citations

Distinguished Flying Cross
"Lt. Joseph Leonard Maries White (late Canadian Machine Gun Corps).
This officer is distinguished for his bravery and dash in action, never hesitating to attack, regardless of the enemy's numerical superiority. He has destroyed three enemy aircraft and driven down two out of control. In addition he has carried out most valuable reconnaissance service at low altitudes."

Distinguished Flying Cross – Bar
"Lt. (T./Capt.) Joseph Leonard Maries White, D.F.C. (Can. M.G.C.).
In company with another pilot this officer recently attacked a hostile formation of fourteen scouts. One of these he shot down in flames, and a second out of control. Captain White not only displays courage and skill of a high order in attacking machines in the air and troops on the ground, but he has rendered excellent service on reconnaissance duty, obtaining most valuable information."

References

Notes

Websites

Canadian aviators
Canadian World War I flying aces
1897 births
1925 deaths
Recipients of the Distinguished Flying Cross (United Kingdom)